The Girl from the South Seas is a 1950 West German comedy film directed by Hans Müller and starring Angelika Hauff, Madelon Truß and Hardy Krüger.

The film's sets were designed by the art directors Ernst H. Albrecht and Theo Zwierski.

Cast
 Angelika Hauff as Lale Pieper
 Madelon Truß as Jessie Altkamp
 Hardy Krüger as Richard Kirbach
 Peter Mosbacher as Ralph Wandrey
 Albert Florath as Arnold Pieper
 Erna Sellmer as Wilhelma
 Ah Yue Lou as Kurri
 Käthe Haack as Frau Wellenkamp
 Walter Giller as Lothar
 Hubert von Meyerinck
 Franz Schafheitlin
 Carl Voscherau
 Wolfgang Rotberg
 Karl-Heinz Peters
 Horst von Otto
 Kurt Meister
 Joseph Offenbach
 Herbert Wilk
 Arnim Dahl as Verkehrspolizist

References

Bibliography
 Bock, Hans-Michael & Bergfelder, Tim. The Concise CineGraph. Encyclopedia of German Cinema. Berghahn Books, 2009.

External links 
 

1950 films
1950 comedy films
German comedy films
West German films
1950s German-language films
Films directed by Hans Müller
German black-and-white films
1950s German films